Boatswain's Mate Henry Dow (born 1840) was a Scottish soldier who fought in the American Civil War. Dow received the United States' highest award for bravery during combat, the Medal of Honor, for his action aboard the  during the Siege of Vicksburg on 27 May 1863. He was honored with the award on 10 July 1863.

Biography
Dow was born in Scotland in 1840. He enlisted into the United States Navy from Illinois.

Medal of Honor citation

See also

List of American Civil War Medal of Honor recipients: A–F

References

1840 births
Scottish-born Medal of Honor recipients
Scottish emigrants to the United States
People of Illinois in the American Civil War
Union Navy officers
United States Navy Medal of Honor recipients
American Civil War recipients of the Medal of Honor
Year of death missing